F.C. Carpenedolo S.S.D., commonly known as Carpenedolo, is an Italian association football club, based in Carpenedolo, Lombardy.

History

In the Serie C2 2007-08 regular season, Carpenedolo finished second in Girone A, and qualified for the promotion playoffs.  The team was defeated by fifth-placed Mezzocorona in the semi-finals, 2–1 on aggregate, thus remaining in the 4th level of Italian Football, now called Lega Pro Seconda Divisione for the 2008–09 season.

At the end of the 2009-10 Lega Pro Seconda Divisione season the club was relegated to Serie D.

It in the season 2010–11, from Serie D group D relegated, in the play-out, to Eccellenza Lombardy, but August 5, 2011, it was later readmitted to Serie D to fill vacancies.

In 2012 the sports title of the club was moved to Montichiari as F.C. Atletico Montichiari, in order to be a spiritual successor of A.C. Montichiari. The club's logo and football history was then acquired by a new club, restarting from youth football as Atletico Carpenedolo. The club then rejoined senior football in 2018 from Terza Categoria and then acquired the sports title of Sporting Desenzano, being renamed F.C. Carpenedolo S.S.D..

References

External links

Football clubs in Lombardy
Association football clubs established in 1957
Serie C clubs
1957 establishments in Italy
Province of Brescia